Ras Laffan Industrial City is an industrial hub located  north of Doha, Qatar.  It is administrated by QatarEnergy.

Ras Laffan Industrial City is Qatar's main site for production of liquefied natural gas and gas-to-liquid. It hosts among others ORYX GTL and Pearl GTL plants, Qatargas LNG plants, and the Dolphin gas processing plant, the Laffan Refinery, and Ras Laffan A, B, and C integrated water and power plants. With an enclosed water area of approximately 4,500 hectares Ras Laffan Port is the largest artificial harbour in the world and contains the world's largest LNG export facility.

History

The earliest-known English text to describe Ras Laffan was in the 1890 book The Persian Gulf Pilot,  published by the United Kingdom Hydrographic Office. It recounts only geographic features, implying that the area was not settled at the time. In an early 1904 transcript of the Gazetteer of the Persian Gulf, Oman and Central Arabia by John G. Lorimer, it is mentioned that a pearling bank known as Umm Al Shebh is found off the coast of Ras Laffan, although Lorimer provides no description of Ras Laffan itself.

As an industrial city, Ras Laffan was commissioned in 1996. The purpose of its founding was to host petrochemical facilities for the natural gas obtained from North Field. The North Field, found in 1971, is the world's biggest natural gas field, occupying an offshore area of roughly 6,000 square km; more than half the size of the State of Qatar. North Field contains over 900 trillion tcsf of recoverable gas.

Ras Laffan's commissioning in 1996 marks the completion date for the city's first liquefied natural gas (LNG) plant to convert the natural gas obtained from North Field into LNG. At first, it was estimated that only 106 square km would be needed for industrial operations. However, in 2004, this figure was more than drastically increased, to 296 square km.

In March 2011, the city signed a memorandum of understanding with the Port of Rotterdam on the occasion of an official visit by Queen Beatrix to Qatar.

Qatargas announced in May 2019 that the company's Ras Laffan terminal received its 10,000th non-LNG related shipment.

Geography and environment

Ras Laffan is located at a very low elevation and has sandy soils. There is a reef off the coast. Together with Fuwayrit, Ras Laffan accommodates approximately 30% of all sea turtle nests in Qatar. Roughly 17 hectares of mangroves are found off the coast of Ras Laffan.

Furthermore, the waters had an average pH of 8.05, a salinity of 46.94 psu, an average temperature of 24.6 °C and 6.86 mg/L of dissolved oxygen.

Laffan Environmental Society is an environmental NGO formed as a joint partnership between QatarEnergy Industrial Cities and several other large companies operating in Ras Laffan. It was established as a response to calls for improved environmental management in the area surrounding the city resulting from petrochemical processing.

Companies

Industrial infrastructure
Currently, Ras Laffan accommodates three power generation and water desalination plants, abbreviated as Ras Laffan A, B, and C (also known as Ras Qartas Energy Plant). In 2014, Kahramaa announced a planned project which would see the desalination capacity of the plants increase from 35 million gallons of water per day to 65 million gallons per day. The project began in 2017.

In 1999, QatarEnergy proposed to construct a facility which would meet the water cooling requirements of Ras Laffan's petrochemical industries. This project came to fruition with the launch of the facility's inaugural phase in 2003 with an hourly production capacity of 308,000 cubic meters of seawater. By 2010, the two remaining phases were completed, increasing the hourly production capacity to 937,000 cubic meters of seawater.

In 2017, Qatargas and ExxonMobil launched the $10.4 billion Barzan Gas Project as a joint venture.

Ras Laffan Emergency & Safety College
Ras Laffan Emergency & Safety College is a training center for emergency professionals created to address the safety needs of the city's industrial companies.

Ras Laffan Support Services Area
Companies providing support services to the petrochemicals in Ras Laffan have been based in the specially-designated Ras Laffan Support Services Area since its inauguration in March 2013. The area's facilities consist of three large-scale workshops, a yard, and an administration building occupying an area of 46,600 square meters. Mainly, companies based in this area provide replacement and repair of damaged electrical and petrochemical-related equipment.

Port of Ras Laffan
The Port of Ras Laffan is the world's biggest petrochemicals export port, taking up a grand total of 56 square km. The first time an LNG carrier docked in the port was in 1996. In 2015, the port had the capacity to dock 200 tankers annually.

Erhama bin Jaber Al Jalahma Shipyard
Named after the legendary Arab pirate Rahmah ibn Jabir al-Jalahimah, the Erhama bin Jaber Al Jalahma Shipyard occupies 110 hectares and is used by Nakilat Damen Shipyards Qatar.

Health
The city is served by Ras Laffan Hospital, which is spread over 200,000 square meters and features four levels, including an underground level. The bed capacity is 118, with future plans to expand this with the addition of 100 beds. A mosque with a 400-worshiper capacity is also in the works. It has a 30-bed emergency building distributed over 6,000 square meters of the hospital. Hamad Medical Corporation (HMC) is responsible for overseeing the hospital's financing.

One health clinic is in the city, and like the hospital, it too is financed by HMC.

Transport
Ras Laffan is connected with Al Khor City through Al Huwailah Link Road. In November 2014, the 16-km road was improved by increasing it from one lane to four lanes.

References

External links
 Ras Laffan Industrial City Official website

Cities in Qatar
Populated coastal places in Qatar
Populated places in Al Khor